Missulena hoggi is a species of mygalomorph spiders in the family Actinopodidae. It is found in Western Australia.

References

hoggi
Spiders described in 1943